Zeynep Tanyalçın (born 28 June 1994), better known by her stage name Lil Zey, is a Turkish rapper, songwriter and DJ.

Biography
Tanyalçın studied music management and songwriting at Berklee College of Music. In 2019, she voiced two songs in the album METFLIX, released under the label RedKeys Music. In the same year, she attracted the attention of the music market and the press with the song "Ötede Dur", released as a duet with KÖK$VL. She continued her career with the song "Yolumuz Yol Değil", which is a duet song with Khontkar. Towards the last months of 2019, she made a duet with Metth in the song "Marina". She released her first solo single named "Heveslenmem" in 2020. Tanyalçın signed a contract with "Universal Music Production" in 2020. Lil Zey was a nominee in the "Best Debut" category at the "17th Radyo Boğaziçi Music Awards".

Discography

Singles and featurings
 Turn me Cold (2019) (feat. Metth)
 Dont @ Me (2019) (feat. Metth)
 Ötede Dur (2019) (feat. KÖK$VL)
 Yolumuz Yol Değil (2019) (feat. Khontkar)
 Marina (2019) (feat. Metth)
 Heveslenmem (2020)
 Eskisi Gibi (2020) (feat. Kozmos)
 Zor & Zor II (2020)
 Meditasyon (2021) (feat. GRKM)
 1 Gr Eksik (2021)
 ELMAS (2021) (feat. Luciano)
 Matrix (2021) 
 80 Kere (2021) (feat. Rosalie.)
 Geçmişi Sil (2021) (feat. Kozmos)
 Keşif  (2022) (feat. BYTE & Chasnu
 OnlyFans (2022)

Albums
 Kara Tiyatro (2021)

Awards and nominations

References

External links
 
 

Turkish rappers
Turkish songwriters
1994 births
Turkish women singers
Turkish hip hop
Turkish lyricists
Turkish male singers
Living people